Olaf Schmäler (born 10 November 1969) is a German former footballer. He is the twin brother of Nils Schmäler.

External links

1969 births
Living people
German twins
German footballers
Association football forwards
Eintracht Braunschweig players
VfB Stuttgart players
VfB Stuttgart II players
SV Waldhof Mannheim players
Twin sportspeople
Bundesliga players
2. Bundesliga players
People from Lüneburg
Footballers from Lower Saxony
West German footballers